A lien ( or ) is a form of security interest granted over an item of property to secure the payment of a debt or performance of some other obligation. The owner of the property, who grants the lien, is referred to as the lienee and the person who has the benefit of the lien is referred to as the lienor or lien holder.

The etymological root is Anglo-French lien or loyen, meaning "bond", "restraint", from Latin ligamen, from ligare "to bind".

In the United States, the term lien generally refers to a wide range of encumbrances and would include other forms of mortgage or charge. In the US, a lien characteristically refers to nonpossessory security interests.

In other common-law countries, the term lien refers to a very specific type of security interest, being a passive right to retain (but not sell) property until the debt or other obligation is discharged.  In contrast to the usage of the term in the US, in other countries it refers to a purely possessory form of security interest; indeed, when possession of the property is lost, the lien is released.

Equitable lien
In common-law countries, equitable liens give rise to unique and difficult issues. An equitable lien is a nonpossessory security right conferred by operation of law, which is similar in effect to an equitable charge. It differs from a charge in that it is non-consensual. It is conferred only in very limited circumstances, the most common (and least ambiguous) of which is in relation to the sale of land; an unpaid vendor has an equitable lien over the land for the purchase price, notwithstanding that the purchaser has gone into occupation of the property. It is seen as a counterweight to the equitable rule which confers a beneficial interest in the land on the purchaser once contracts are exchanged for purchase.

It is a matter of conjecture how far equitable liens extend outside of the unpaid vendor's lien. Equitable liens have been held to exist in a number of cases involving choses in action, but not yet in relation to chattels. The Australian courts have been the most receptive towards equitable liens in relation to personal property (see Hewett v Court (1983) 57 ALJR 211), but a review of the cases still leaves a lack of clarity in relation to the principles upon which an equitable lien will be imposed.
 In Re Stucley [1906] 1 Ch 67, a vendor of a reversionary interest in a trust fund, who sold the interest to the trustee, was held to have an equitable lien in the subject matter, although it was clearly personalty and not realty.
 In Barker v Cox (1876) 4 Ch D 464, the purchaser of property which was included in a matrimonial settlement paid the price in advance to one of the trustees, and the purchaser was held to have an equitable lien in investments which the trustees subsequently acquired with the purchase price.
 In Langen and Wing v Bell [1972] Ch 685, a director's service agreement required him to assign his shares in the company if he was terminated, and he was to receive a price calculated at a later date when the annual accounts were available; he was held to have an equitable lien over the transferred shares to secure the payment of the eventual purchase price.
 In Lord Napier and Ettrick v Hunter [1993] 2 WLR 42, it was held that an indemnity insurer's subrogation rights in relation to funds improperly paid directly to the insured were subject to an equitable lien.

But overall, there is still perceived to be a lack of central nexus.

Statutory liens and contractual liens
Although arguably not liens as such, two other forms of encumbrance are sometimes referred to as liens.

Statutory liens
Certain statutes provide for a passive right to retain property against its owner as security for obligations. For example, section 88 of the Civil Aviation Act 1982 of the United Kingdom permits an airport to detain aircraft for unpaid airport charges and aviation fuel. Although this right has been treated as a lien under UK insolvency law, it has been argued that such statutory rights are not in fact liens, but rights analogous to liens, although an argument may be made that this is a distinction without a difference.

Contractual liens
It has also been argued that an agreement by contract that one party may retain the goods of another party until paid is not a lien, as under the common law, liens could only be non-consensual. However, it appears that under insolvency law, such rights will be treated as liens even if they are not expressed to be liens.

Maritime liens

A maritime lien is a lien on a vessel, given to secure the claim of a creditor who provided maritime services to the vessel or who suffered an injury from the vessel's use.  Maritime liens are sometimes referred to as tacit hypothecation.  Maritime liens have little in common with other liens under the laws of most jurisdictions.

The maritime lien has been described as "one of the most striking peculiarities of Admiralty law".  A maritime lien constitutes a security interest upon ships of a nature otherwise unknown to the common law or equity.  It arises purely by operation of law and exists as a claim upon the property concerned, both secret and invisible, often given priority by statute over other forms of registered security interest.  Although characteristics vary under the laws of different countries, it can be described as:
 a privileged claim,
 upon maritime property,
 for service to it or damage done by it,
 accruing from the moment that the claim attaches,
 travelling with the property unconditionally,
 enforced by an action in rem.

Nomenclature

Throughout the world, there are a large number of different types and sub-divisions of liens.  Not all of the following liens exist in all legal systems that recognise the concept of a lien.  The following are descriptions that are not necessarily mutually exclusive.  Types of lien include

 accountant's lien—the right of an accountant to retain a client's papers until the accountant's fees have been paid.
 agent's lien
 agister's lien—the lien of an agister over animals in the agister's care as security for fees.
 agricultural lien (United States)—a statutory lien that protects the seller of farming equipment by giving the seller a lien on crops grown with the equipment.
 architect's lien—the right of an architect to retain a client's papers until the architect's fees have been paid.
 attachment lien—a lien on property seized by pre-judgment attachment.
 attorney's lien—the right of an attorney to retain a client's papers until the attorney's fees have been paid (also referred to as a charging lien, solicitor's lien or a retaining lien in some jurisdictions).
 banker's lien—the right of a bank to satisfy a customer's matured debt by seizing the customer's money or property within the bank's possession.
 blanket lien—a lien that gives the lienor the entitlement to take possession of any or all of the lienee's real property to cover a delinquent loan.
 carrier's lien—a carrier's right to retain possession of cargo until the owner of the cargo pays shipping costs.
 choate lien (United States)—a lien in which the lienee, the property, and the monetary amount are established so that the lien is perfected and nothing else needs to be done to make the lien enforceable.
 common-law lien—a lien arising under the common law, rather than by statute, equity or agreement between the parties.
 concurrent lien—means one of two or more liens over the same property.
 consummate lien (United States)—a judgment lien arising after the denial of motion for a new trial.
 conventional lien (United States)—a lien that is created by agreement between the parties, in circumstances where the law would not otherwise create a lien.
 deferred lien (United States)—a lien that only takes effect from a future date.
 demurrage lien—a carrier's lien on goods for any unpaid demurrage charges.
 dragnet lien (United States)—a lien that is enlarged to cover any additional credit extended to the debtor to the same creditor.
 environmental lien—a charge, security, or encumbrance on a property's title to secure payment of cost or debt arising from response actions, cleanup, or other remediation of hazardous substances or petroleum products.
 equitable lien—a lien that is enlarged to cover any additional credit extended to the debtor to the same creditor.
 execution lien—a lien on property seized by levy of execution.
 factor's lien—a lien, usually statutory, on property held on consignment by a factor.
 first lien—a lien that takes priority over all other encumbrances over the same property.
 floating lien (United States)—a lien that is expanded to cover any additional property that is acquired by the lienee while the debt is outstanding (in common-law countries, see Floating charge).
 garnishment lien—a lien on the debtor's property held by a garnishee.
 general lien—a possessory lien by which the lien holder may retain any of the debtor's goods in the lien holder's possession until any debt due from the debtor, whether in connection with the retained goods or otherwise, has been paid. Factors, insurance brokers, packers, stockbrokers and banker's liens are all usually general liens.
 healthcare lien (United States)—a statutory lien asserted by an HMO, insurer, medical group or independent practice association against those liable to the, also its patient in damages, to recover money paid or claim money payable for healthcare services provided (sometimes called a healthcare lien).
 hospital lien (United States)—a statutory lien asserted by a hospital to recover the costs of emergency and other ongoing medical and other services.
 hotelkeeper's lien—a possessory or statutory lien allowing an innkeeper to hold, as security for payment, personal property that a guest has brought into the hotel (also referred to as an innkeeper's lien).
 inchoate lien—a lien that may be defeated if the relevant judgment is vacated or a motion for a new trial is granted.
 involuntary lien—a lien arising without the lienee's consent.
 judgment lien—a lien imposed on a judgment debtor's non-exempt property.
 judicial lien—a lien obtained by judgment, levy, sequestration or other legal or equitable process or proceeding.
 junior lien—a lien that is junior or subordinate to another lien on the same property.
 landlord's lien—a lien which empowered a landlord to seize a tenant's property and sell it to satisfy overdue rent.
 manufacturer's lien—a statutory lien that secures payment for labour or materials expended in producing goods for another.
 maritime lien—see above.
 mechanic's lien—also sometimes referred to as an artisan's lien, chattel lien, construction lien, labourer's lien, in various jurisdictions.
 mineral lien—a lien on working interest that secures payment for labor or materials expended by oilfield service companies. 
 mortgage lien—a lien on the mortgagor's property securing the mortgage.
 municipal lien (United States)—a lien by a municipal corporation against a property owner for the owner's proportional share of a public improvement that specifically and individually benefits the owner.
 possessory lien—a lien allowing the creditor to keep possession of the encumbered property until the debt is satisfied.
 second lien—a lien that is next in rank after a first lien on the same property.
 secret lien—a lien not appearing of record and unknown to the purchasers; a lien reserved by the vendor and kept hidden from third parties to secure the payment of goods after delivery.
 solicitor's lien—the right of a solicitor to recover his costs from a client. It is broader than a conventional lien.
 special lien—a possessory lien by which the possessor of goods has the right to retain specific goods until a debt incurrent in connection with the goods has been paid (also referred to as a particular lien). The opposite of a general lien.
 statutory lien—a lien arising solely by force of statute.
 tax lien—a lien on property and all rights to property imposed by the taxing authority for unpaid taxes.
 vendee's lien—a buyer's lien on the purchased land as security for repayment of purchase money paid in, enforceable if the seller cannot or does not convey good title.
 vendor's lien—a seller's lien on land as security for the purchase price (sometimes called an unpaid vendor's lien).
 voluntary lien—a lien created with the lienee's consent.
 warehouser's lien—a lien for storage charges for goods stored with a bailee (sometimes called a warehouseman's lien).
 workers' compensation lien—a statutory lien, asserted by a healthcare provider, to recover the cost of emergency and ongoing medical work, usually asserted against any workers'-compensation benefits paid to a patient.

See also
 Bottomry
 Detinue
 False lien
 Mechanic's lien
 Mortgage
 Replevin
 Repossession
 Security interest—lien
 Tax lien
 Distraint

Notes

References

Property law
Common law legal terminology
Business law
 
Property law legal terminology